Shaldeh may refer to:
 Shaldeh, Fuman
 Shaldeh, Shaft